The Great Annihilator is the ninth studio album by American experimental rock band Swans. It was released on January 23, 1995, through frontman Michael Gira's own record label, Young God. The album has been described by Gira as a companion album to his solo album Drainland (1995); the two were remastered and re-released together in April 2017.

Critical reception 

The Great Annihilator received a generally positive reception from critics. AllMusic called the album "an epic, incredible work of art." Trouser Press, on the other hand, wrote that the album "reveals [...] that the band is running out of ideas", commenting that is "unlikely to satisfy long-term followers. A more accessible Swans may also be a less cathartic one."

Track listing

Personnel 
Credits adapted from The Great Annihilator liner notes.

Swans
 Michael Gira – vocals, guitars, sounds, art design, production
 Jarboe – vocals, sounds, organ, keyboards
 Bill Rieflin – drums, percussion, sounds, additional sequencing
 Algis Kizys – bass
 Norman Westberg – guitar
 Clinton Steele – guitar

Additional musicians
 Ted Parsons – drums (tracks 3, 4, and 15)
 John Sarfell – piano (track 9)
 Nicky Skopelitis – guitar (track 9)

Technical personnel
 Martin Atkins – additional mastering, drums (tracks 8)
 Martin Bisi – engineering, mixing
 Bryce Goggin – engineering
 Larry Seven – engineering, double bass (track 16)
 Scott Ramsayer – engineering, additional sequencing
 Fred Breitberg – engineering
 Van Christie – engineering
 Jay O'Rourke – mastering
 Doug Henderson – remastering
 Jim Marcus – additional sequencing
 Mark Falls – layout
 Phil Puleo – artwork

References 

1995 albums
Swans (band) albums
Young God Records albums
Albums produced by Michael Gira